Třesovice is a municipality and village in Hradec Králové District in the Hradec Králové Region of the Czech Republic. It has about 300 inhabitants.

Administrative parts
The village of Popovice is an administrative part of Třesovice.

Geography
It lies in a flat agrictulral landscape of the East Elbe Table. The municipality is situated on the left bank of the Bystřice River.

History
The first written mention of Třesovice is from 1412, Popovice was first mentioned in 1398. Třesovice was probably founded in the 11th or 12th century. From the 13th century, it was owned by the Minorite monastery of St. George in Hradec Králové. After the monastery was destroyed during the Hussite Wars, Třesovice was acquired by Diviš Bořek of Miletínek, then it changed owners many times. The most notable owners of the village were the Schaffgotsch family, who held it from 1707 to 1788. In 1829, Třesovice was bought by the Harrach family and joined to the Sadová estate.

Sights
The architectural monument of Popovice is an old wooden mill on the Bystřice river. Next to the mill stands a memorial oak whose age is estimated to be more than 600 years old.

References

External links

Villages in Hradec Králové District